Brigadier John Fredrick Halangode, VSV was a Sri Lankan army officer. He founded of the Gemunu Watch, having served as the first commanding officer of the 1st Battalion, Gemunu Watch.

Educated at Trinity College, Kandy, Halangode joined the Ceylon Defence Force and was commissioned as a Second Lieutenant in the Ceylon Light Infantry in 1941 during World War II. He joined the Ceylon Police Force at the end of the war when he was demobilised. Following the formation of the Ceylon Army in 1949, he was commissioned as a regular officer with the rank of captain. He was then posted as a company commander in the 1st Battalion, Ceylon Light Infantry. Having attended training courses in the United Kingdom and Pakistan, he was posted as the first Officer Commanding,  Army Recruit Training Depot in Diyatalawa. When the depot was expanded into the Army Training Centre, Diyatalawa he became the Second in Command and then its Commanding Officer. Following the 1962 Ceylonese coup d'état attempt, the government decided to form the third infantry regiment and Lieutenant Colonel Halangode was selected to as its first Commanding Officer. The Gemunu Watch was formed in December 1962, with Halangode as commanding officer of the 1st Battalion, was instrumental in forming and expanding the new regiment establish its own traditions and identity. Later, two volunteer battalions were also formed in 1964 and 1965. Prior to his retirement, he served as Commander Troops, Colombo.

His son was Brigadier Hiran Halangode, RWP, RSP, USP who served as Brigade Commander of the 12th Brigade and Air Mobile Brigade.

References

Year of birth missing

Gemunu Watch officers
Ceylon Light Infantry officers
Sinhalese police officers
Alumni of Trinity College, Kandy